The 2020 St. Louis Cardinals season was the 139th for the St. Louis Cardinals of the Major League Baseball (MLB), a franchise in St. Louis, Missouri. It was the 129th season for the Cardinals in the National League (NL), and their 15th at Busch Stadium III. They entered the season as defending NL Central champions.

On March 12, 2020, MLB announced that because of the ongoing COVID-19 pandemic, the start of the regular season would be delayed by at least two weeks in addition to the remainder of spring training being cancelled. Four days later, it was announced that the start of the season would be pushed back indefinitely due to the recommendation made by the CDC to restrict events of more than 50 people for eight weeks.

On June 23, commissioner Rob Manfred unilaterally implemented a 60-game season. Players reported to training camps on July 1 in order to resume spring training and prepare for a July 24 Opening Day.

On July 1, 2020, it was announced the Cardinals would play the Chicago White Sox on August 13 in the inaugural MLB at Field of Dreams game, replacing the New York Yankees. The appearance in Dyersville, Iowa also replaces the team's canceled trip to London in June for a series with National League Central rivals, the Chicago Cubs. On August 3, MLB canceled the Field of Dreams game due to "logistical problems."

The Cardinals made the expanded playoffs but lost to the San Diego Padres in the 2020 National League Wild Card Series. The Cardinals suffered just their second winner-take-all game loss in the postseason over their last 10 winner-take-all postseason games played dating back to 2002 (2012 NLCS Game 7 being the other).

Regular season 
On August 13, the New York Yankees and Chicago White Sox were scheduled to play the first ever MLB at Field of Dreams game in Dyersville, Iowa. But due to the pandemic and the MLB commissioner announcing the 60-game season and that the AL and NL will play against each other in the same division, the Yankees were taken off the match. On July 1, the MLB announced that the Cardinals will replace the Yankees in the game against the White Sox. The game was subsequently postponed to August 12, 2021, with the White Sox' opponent once again being the Yankees. Also, on June 13–14, the Cardinals were supposed to play against the Chicago Cubs in the London Series. But that was also cancelled due to the pandemic.

Game log

|- style="background:#ccffcc;"
| 1 || July 24 || Pirates || 5–4 || Flaherty (1–0) || Musgrove (0–1) || Kim (1) || 1–0 || W1
|- style="background:#ccffcc;"
| 2 || July 25 || Pirates || 9–1 || Wainwright (1–0) || Williams (0–1) || — || 2–0 || W2
|- style="background:#ffbbbb;"
| 3 || July 26 || Pirates || 1–5 || Keller (1–0) || Hudson (0–1) || – || 2–1 || L1
|- style="background:#ffbbbb;"
| 4 || July 28 || @Twins || 3–6 || Bailey (1–0) || Martínez (0–1) || Romo (1) || 2–2 || L2
|- style="background:#ffbbbb;"
| 5 || July 29 || @Twins || 0–3 || Hill (1–0) || Ponce de Leon (0–1) || Rogers (1) || 2–3 || L3
|- style="background:#bbbbbb;"
| — || July 31 || @Brewers || colspan="7" | Postponed (COVID-19) (Makeup date: August 2) 
|-

|- style="background:#bbbbbb;"
| — || August 1 || @Brewers || colspan="7" | Postponed (COVID-19) (Makeup date: September 14)   
|- style="background:#bbbbbb;"
| — || August 2 (1) || @Brewers || colspan="7" | Postponed (COVID-19) (Makeup date: September 16)  
|- style="background:#bbbbbb;"
| — || August 2 (2) || @Brewers || colspan="7" | Postponed (COVID-19) (Makeup date: September 25) 
|- style="background:#bbbbbb;"
| — || August 3 || Tigers || colspan="7" | Postponed (COVID-19) (Makeup date: August 5)   
|- style="background:#bbbbbb;"
| — || August 4 || @Tigers || colspan="7" | Postponed (COVID-19) (Makeup date: August 13)   
|- style="background:#bbbbbb;"
| — || August 5 (1) || @Tigers || colspan="7" | Postponed (COVID-19) (Makeup date: August 13)  
|- style="background:#bbbbbb;"
| — || August 5 (2) || Tigers || colspan="7" | Postponed (COVID-19) (Makeup date: September 10)   
|- style="background:#bbbbbb;"
| — || August 6 || Tigers || colspan="7" | Postponed (COVID-19) (Makeup date: September 10)  
|- style="background:#bbbbbb;"
| — || August 7 || Cubs || colspan="7" | Postponed (COVID-19) (Makeup date: August 17)   
|- style="background:#bbbbbb;"
| — || August 8 || Cubs || colspan="7" | Postponed (COVID-19) (Makeup date: August 19)   
|- style="background:#bbbbbb;"
| — || August 9 || Cubs || colspan="7" | Postponed (COVID-19) (Makeup date: September 5)  
|- style="background:#bbbbbb;"
| — || August 10 || Pirates || colspan="7" | Postponed (COVID-19) (Makeup date: August 27)  
|- style="background:#bbbbbb;"
| — || August 11 || Pirates || colspan="7" | Postponed (COVID-19) (Makeup date: August 27) 
|- style="background:#bbbbbb;"
| — || August 12 || Pirates || colspan="7" | Postponed (COVID-19) (Makeup date: September 18)  
|- style="background:#bbbbbb;"
| — || August 13 || @White Sox  || colspan="7" | Postponed (Logistics at "Field of Dreams") (Makeup date: August 14)  
|- style="background:#bbbbbb;"
| — || August 13 (1) || @Tigers  || colspan="7" | Postponed (COVID-19) (Makeup date: September 28)  
|- style="background:#bbbbbb;"
| — || August 13 (2) || @Tigers   || colspan="7" | Postponed (COVID-19) (Makeup date: September 28)  
|- style="background:#bbbbbb;"
| — || August 14 || @White Sox || colspan="7" | Postponed (COVID-19) (Makeup date: August 15)  
|-style="background:#ccffcc;"
| 6 || August 15 (1) || @White Sox || 5–1 || Wainwright (2–0) || Giolito (1–2) || – || 3–3 || W1
|-style="background:#ccffcc;"
| 7 || August 15 (2) || @White Sox || 6–3 || Cabrera (1–0) || Marshall (0–1) || Miller (1) || 4–3 || W2
|-style="background:#ffbbbb;"
| 8 || August 16 || @White Sox || 2–7 || Keuchel (3–2) || Hudson (0–2) || — || 4–4 || L1
|-style="background:#ccffcc;"
| 9 || August 17 || @Cubs || 3–1 || Gallegos (1–0) || Hendricks (3–2) || Miller (2) || 5–4 || W1
|-style="background:#ffbbbb;" 
| 10 || August 17 || Cubs || 4–5 || Underwood Jr. (1–0) || Webb (0–1) || Jeffress (2) || 5–5 || L1
|-style="background:#ffbbbb;"
| 11 || August 18 || @Cubs || 3–6 || Darvish (4–1) || Ponce de Leon (0–2) || Wick (4) || 5–6 || L2
|-style="background:#ccffcc;"
| 12 || August 19 || @Cubs || 9–3  || Webb (1–1) || Mills (2–2) || — || 6–6 || W1
|-style="background:#ffbbbb;"
| 13 || August 19 || Cubs || 2–4  || Jeffress (2–1) || Miller (0–1) || Kimbrel (1) || 6–7 || L1
|-style="background:#ccffcc;"
| 14 || August 20 || Reds || 5–4 || Elledge (1–0) || Iglesias (1–2) || — || 7–7 || W1
|-style="background:#ffbbbb;"
| 15 || August 21 || Reds || 2–4 || Lorenzen (1–1) || Cabrera (1–1) || Iglesias (3) || 7–8 || L1
|-style="background:#ccffcc;"
| 16 || August 22 || Reds || 3–0 || Kim (1–0) || Miley (0–3) || Gallegos (1) || 8–8 || W1
|-style="background:#ccffcc;"
| 17 || August 23 || Reds || 6–2 || Cabrera (2–1) || Mahle (0–1) || — || 9–8 || W2
|-style="background:#ccffcc;"
| 18 || August 24 || Royals || 9–3 || Flaherty (2–0) || Keller (3–1) || — || 10–8 || W3
|-style="background:#ffbbbb;"
| 19 || August 25 || Royals || 4–5 || Staumont (1–1) || Gant (0–1) || Rosenthal (7) || 10–9 || L1
|-style="background:#ccffcc;"
| 20 || August 26 || Royals || 6–5 || Reyes (1–0) || Rosario (0–1) || — || 11–9 || W1
|-style="background:#ffbbbb;"
| 21 || August 27 || Pirates || 3–4  || Stratton (2–0) || Gant (0–2) || Rodríguez (2) || 11–10 || L1
|-style="background:#ffbbbb;"
| 22 || August 27 ||Pirates || 0–2  || Ponce (1–1) || Oviedo (0–1) || Turley (1) || 11–11 || L2
|-style="background:#ffbbbb;"
| 23 || August 28 || Indians || 2–14 || Hill (1–0) || Ponce de Leon (0–3) || Plutko (1) || 11–12 || L3
|-style="background:#ffbbbb;"
| 24 || August 29 || Indians || 1–2  || Wittgren (2–0) || Reyes (1–1) || Hand (10) || 11–13 || L4
|-style="background:#ccffcc;"
| 25 || August 30 || Indians || 7–2 || Wainwright (3–0) || Civale (3–4) || — || 12–13 || W1
|-style="background:#ccffcc;"
| 26 || August 31 || @Reds || 7–5 || Hudson (1–2) || DeSclafani (1–2) || Gallegos (2) || 13–13 || W2
|-

|-style="background:#ccffcc;"
| 27 || September 1 || @Reds || 16–2 || Kim (2–0) || Gray (5–2) || — || 14–13 || W3 
|-style="background:#ffbbbb;"
| 28 || September 2 || @Reds || 3–4 || Iglesias (2–2) || Gallegos (1–1) || — || 14–14 || L1  
|-style="background:#ffbbbb;"
| 29 || September 4 || @Cubs || 1–4 || Darvish (7–1) || Flaherty (2–1) || Jeffress (5) || 14–15 || L2
|-style="background:#ccffcc;"
|30 || September 5 || @Cubs || 4–2  || Wainwright (4–0) || Alzolay (0–1) || Gallegos (3) || 15–15 || W1
|-style="background:#ccffcc;"
|31|| September 5 || Cubs || 5–1  || Helsley (1–0) || Rea (1–1) || — || 16–15 || W2
|-style="background:#ccffcc;"
| 32 || September 6 || @Cubs || 7–3 || Hudson (2–2) || Lester (2–2) || — || 17–15 || W3
|-style="background:#ffbbbb;"
| 33|| September 7 || @Cubs || 1–5 || Hendricks (5–4) || Oviedo (0–2) || — || 17–16 || L1
|-style="background:#ffbbbb;"
|34 || September 8 || Twins || 3–7  || Berríos (4–3) || Martínez (0–2) || — || 17–17 || L2
|-style="background:#ccffcc;"
|35 || September 8 || Twins || 6–4  || Cabrera (3–1) || Dobnak (6–3) || Gallegos (4) || 18–17 || W1
|-style="background:#ccffcc;"
| 36 ||  September 10 || Tigers || 12–2  || Flaherty (3–1) || Skubal (1–2) || — || 19–17 || W2
|-style="background:#ffbbbb;"
| 37 || September 10 || Tigers || 3–6  || Cisnero (2–2) || Gallegos (1–2) || Garcia (2) || 19–18 || L1
|-style="background:#ffbbbb;"
| 38 || September 11 || Reds || 1–3 || Castillo (2–5) || Wainwright (4–2) || — || 19–19 || L2
|-style="background:#ccffcc;"
| 39 || September 12 || Reds || 7–1 || Hudson (3–2) || Antone (0–2) || — || 20–19 || W1
|-style="background:#ffbbbb;"
| 40 || September 13 || Reds || 5–10 || Bradley (2–0) || Gant (0–3) || Iglesias (7) || 20–20 || L1
|-style="background:#ffbbbb;"
| 41 || September 14 || @Brewers || 1–2  || Peralta (2–1) || Helsley (1–1) || — || 20–21 || L2
|-style="background:#ccffcc;"
| 42|| September 14 || @Brewers || 3–2  || Cabrera (4–1) || Topa (0–1) || Webb (1) || 21–21 || W1
|-style="background:#ffbbbb;"
| 43 || September 15 || @Brewers || 3–18 || Anderson (3–3) || Flaherty (3–2) || — || 21–22 || L1
|-style="background:#ccffcc;"
| 44 || September 16 || @Brewers || 4–2  || Wainwright (5–1) || Woodruff (2–4) || — || 22–22 || W1
|-style="background:#ffbbbb;"
| 45 || September 16 || @Brewers || 0–6  || Peralta (3–1) || Oviedo (0–3) || — || 22–23 || L1
|-style="background:#ffbbbb;"
| 46 || September 17 || @Pirates || 1–5 || Brault (1–3) || Gomber (0–1) || — || 22–24 || L2
|-style="background:#ccffcc;"
| 47 || September 18 || @Pirates || 6–5  || Reyes (2–1) || Williams (1–8) || Helsley (1) || 23–24 || W1
|-style="background:#ccffcc;"
| 48 || September 18 || Pirates || 7–2  || Miller (1–1) || Kuhl (1–3) || — || 24–24 || W2
|-style="background:#ccffcc;"
| 49 || September 19 || @Pirates || 5–4 || Woodford (1–0) || Howard (2–3) || Cabrera (1) || 25–24 || W3
|-style="background:#ccffcc;"
| 50 || September 20 || @Pirates || 2–1 || Flaherty (4–2) || Holland (1–3) || Miller (3) || 26–24 || W4
|-style="background:#ffbbbb;"
| 51 || September 21 || @Royals || 1–4 || Staumont (2–1) || Wainwright (5–2) || Holland (6) || 26–25 || L1
|-style="background:#ccffcc;"
| 52 || September 22 || @Royals || 5–0 || Gomber (1–1) || Singer (3–5) || — || 27–25 || W1
|-style="background:#ffbbbb;"
| 53 || September 23 || @Royals || 3–12 || Duffy (4–4) || Martínez (0–3) || — || 27–26 || L1
|-style="background:#ccffcc;"
| 54 || September 24 || Brewers || 4–2 || Kim (3–0) || Burnes (4–1) || Miller (4) || 28–26 || W1
|-style="background:#ffbbbb;"
| 55 || September 25 || Brewers || 0–3 || Williams (4–1) || Flaherty (4–3) || Hader (12) || 28–27 || L1
|-style="background:#ccffcc;"
| 56 || September 25 || @Brewers || 9–1  || Ponce de Leon (1–3) || Lindblom (2–4) || — || 29–27 || W1
|-style="background:#ffbbbb;"
| 57 || September 26 || Brewers || 0–3 || Woodruff (3–5) || Wainwright (5–3) || Hader (13) || 29–28 || L1
|-style="background:#ccffcc;"
| 58 || September 27 || Brewers || 5–2 || Gallegos (2–2) || Anderson (4–4) || Reyes (1) || 30–28 || W1
|-style="background:#bbbbbb;"
| 59 || September 28 || @Tigers || colspan="9" | Cancelled 
|-style="background:#bbbbbb;"
| 60 || September 28 || @Tigers || colspan="9" | Cancelled  
|-

|- style="text-align:center;"
| Legend:       = Win       = Loss       = PostponementBold = Cardinals team member

Season standings

National League Central

National League playoff standings

Record vs. opponents

Opening Day lineup

COVID-19 outbreak 
On July 31, 2020, the Cardinals announced two of their players have tested positive for COVID-19. Their game against the Milwaukee Brewers in Milwaukee that day was postponed. Following additional positive test results, the rest of the three-game series with the Brewers and the four-game series with the Detroit Tigers were also postponed. It was later revealed that there were six staff members who had tested positive and seven players including Yadier Molina, Paul DeJong, Edmundo Sosa, Rangel Ravelo, Junior Fernández, and Kodi Whitley. Because of the timing of a simultaneous move to the IR list, it is speculated that the seventh player was Carlos Martinez, which he later confirmed on his personal Instagram.

As the Cardinals prepared to return to play against the Chicago Cubs again on August 7, three additional members of the Cardinals tested positive for COVID-19. As a result, the three-game series against the Cubs was postponed. A day later, the Cardinals three-game series against the  Pittsburgh Pirates was also postponed.  It was later announced that the players were Austin Dean and roommates Ryan Helsley and Lane Thomas. Additionally, one other staff member had newly tested positive bringing the team total of positive tests to 17, including 10 players. Austin Gomber was added to the Covid IL due to contact tracing even though he has not tested positive and returned to play on August 19.

On August 13, it was announced that the Cardinals' season would resume that Saturday with a doubleheader against the Chicago White Sox. Multiple doubleheaders would be added throughout the season to try to make up as many lost games as possible. As part of a series of roster and staff changes, former third base coach Jose Oquendo returned to the team as an addition to the coaching staff while assistant coach Willie McGee opted out for the season due to personal health concerns. Third base coach Pop Warner returned to the club in time for the August 27 doubleheader against the Pittsburgh Pirates.

The Cardinals took the unusual step of renting 41 cars and having staff and players drive from St. Louis to Chicago in their own cars to avoid any further outbreaks. The Cardinals returned to play on August 15 with a doubleheader against the White Sox. After finishing the three-game series against the White Sox, the Cardinals played two doubleheaders in three days against the Cubs. In the second game of each doubleheader, the Cardinals were the designated home team. As a result, the Cardinals played eight games in five days. They finished that stretch with a 4–4 record.

Molina was activated and returned to the lineup on August 20 and many of the others affected were expected to return to the team within a week.

Roster

Debuts
The following players made their Major League Baseball debuts during the 2020 season
 Dylan Carlson (August 15)
 Nabil Crismatt (August 17)
 Jesús Cruz (August 18)
 Seth Elledge (August 16)
 Rob Kaminsky (August 16)
 Kwang Hyun Kim (July 24)
 John Nogowski (August 16)
 Johan Oviedo (August 19)
 Roel Ramírez (August 16)
 Ricardo Sánchez (August 16)
 Max Schrock (August 15)
 Kodi Whitley (July 26)
 Jake Woodford (August 15)

Postseason

Game log

|- style="background:#ccffcc;"
| 1 || September 30 || @ Padres || 7–4 || Gallegos (1–0) || Paddack (0–1) || Reyes (1) || 1–0
|- style="background:#ffbbbb;"
| 2 || October 1 || @ Padres || 9–11 || Pagán (1–0) || Ponce de Leon (0–1) || Rosenthal (1) || 1–1
|- style="background:#ffbbbb;"
| 3 || October 2 || @ Padres || 0–4 || Adams (1–0) || Flaherty (0–1) || — || 1–2
|-

Postseason rosters

| style="text-align:left" |
Pitchers: 21 Andrew Miller 22 Jack Flaherty 29 Alex Reyes 30 Tyler Webb 33 Kwang Hyun Kim 36 Austin Gomber 38 Kodi Whitley 50 Adam Wainwright 56 Ryan Helsley 59 Johan Oviedo 62 Daniel Ponce de Leon 65 Giovanny Gallegos 92 Génesis Cabrera
Catchers: 4 Yadier Molina 7 Andrew Knizner 32 Matt Wieters  
Infielders: 11 Paul DeJong 15 Brad Miller 16 Kolten Wong 19 Tommy Edman 46 Paul Goldschmidt
Outfielders: 0 Austin Dean 3 Dylan Carlson 25 Dexter Fowler 41 Tyler O'Neill 47 Rangel Ravelo 48 Harrison Bader 
Designated hitters: 13 Matt Carpenter
|- valign="top"

Minor league system and first-year player draft

Teams

Major League Baseball draft

The 2020 Major League Baseball (MLB) First-Year Player Draft took place on June 10 and June 11. The draft assigned amateur baseball players to MLB teams. Due to the COVID-19 pandemic, the draft was shortened to five rounds.

2020 Draft Order

2020 Draft Tracker (StL Cardinals)

References

External links
St. Louis Cardinals 2020 schedule at MLB.com
2020 St. Louis Cardinals at ESPN
2020 St. Louis Cardinals season at Baseball Reference

St. Louis Cardinals seasons
St. Louis Cardinals
St. Louis Cardinals